Augustus Howland House is a historic home located at 1395 Sherwood Road in Sherwood in Cayuga County, New York.  It is a "distinctive high-style Italianate" dwelling built about 1850.  It is a -story, six bays wide and three bays deep, heavy timber frame dwelling, topped by a low pitched hipped roof.  It is sheathed in clapboard and features a two bay wide front pavilion.  Included in the listing are four contributing barns (on the south side of Sherwood Road), a laundry building, and two hitching posts.

The Howlands were Quakers, and Augustus Howland donated land for the nearby North Street Friends Meetinghouse.

It was listed on the National Register of Historic Places in 2008.

References

Houses on the National Register of Historic Places in New York (state)
Italianate architecture in New York (state)
Houses completed in 1850
Houses in Cayuga County, New York
1850 establishments in New York (state)
National Register of Historic Places in Cayuga County, New York